Belbari, officially known as Belbari municipality, is one of the major suburb of Morang district, Province No. 1. It lies in the eastern Terai region of Nepal. It was officially upgraded to become a municipality in 2014 AD, which is 2070 BS (Bikram Sambat), which otherwise was a Village Development Committee (VDC) prior to that change. In order to meet the requirements to become a municipality, Belbari VDC merged Kaseni VDC with itself, making it larger in total area. Moreover, in 2017 AD VDC like Dangihat and Bahuni merged with it to become present Belbari Municipality. Now it have 11 wards offices. It had a population of 81,837 people living in 18,945 households making it the third most populous city in Morang district.

Belbari spreads over an approximate area of 25 square miles. All of the area is plane land, geographically. It is bordered on North and East by the largest and the densest forest of Nepal, the Charkose Jhadi (English translation: "Four Yard Bush"). It is bounded on the northeast by Charkose Jhadi, while to the east lies another suburb, Laxmimarga and Kanepokhari Rural Municipality. Similarly, the north part is bounded by Kerabari Rural Municipality and Letang Municipality, while to the west lie the Sundar Haraicha Municipality. As of 2011 Nepal census the total population of Belbari was 24076, which included 5724 households.

Etymology
The name Belbari derived from two different Nepali names "Bel" and "Bari", i.e. "बेल" र "बारी"= बेलबारी. In English, Bel is called wood-apple. Elephant apple and monkey fruit are its other name. Its scientific name is Limonia acidissima. Bel is a native tree of Nepal, and Bari means a dry land. So as a myth, it is believed among older generations that the name Belbari means "the land of the Bel(s)" (Bel-nai-bel bhayeko thau). Religiously, the Bel leaves have its own value in Hindu religion for sacred purpose. Especially leaves of Bel use in the worship, rituals and temples. Basically, for the worship fulpati should be prepared, fulpati is a variety of mixed flowers along with the leaves of Bel which is sacred thing for the God and Goddess. Some ethnic people Rai, Limbu and Dhimal also use Bel's leaves in their rituals such as dhami/jharki (Shamans) of Rais and Limbus, and Bhumi Puja (worship of the earth) of Dhimals. Today Bel trees can be found in the Charkose Jhadi.

Early history
There is not exactly known when the people were first inhabited in Belbari. However, since the end of 19th century, the Dhimals were started to settle on this region. Dhimals are one of the first aboriginal inhabitants of this lowland region who speak a Tibeto-Burman language. Not only Belbari but many lowland plain areas of Morang and Jhapa were their ancestral land. Although Dhimals are the first inhabitants of Belbari, there is no any exact literature about their place of origin.

Production and livelihood systems
Belbari municipality is mainly characterized by strong terrain and fertile land, where the larger flatland is compulsorily using for farming system. Due to the dense forest resource, a number of small streams and wetland, for instance Amuna khola, Sisauli Khola and Betana wetland, are available in this area and those water resources help to the larger flatland for farming system. Paddy, maize, wheat, mustard, varieties of vegetables such as cauliflower, potatoes, ginger, onion are the principal crops grown in this area. Many varieties of paddy are planted in irrigated terraces in two seasons in a single year. In two seasons, during April to September, the fields are using for paddy and maize primarily, farmers are most busy on that period. Although Belbari is semi-urban, most of the people are engaging in agricultural work for their livelihood purpose.

Belbari Municipality is currently divided into 11 Wards.

Local Level Election

Local Level Election 2074 
Not available

Local Level Election 2079

References

 
Nepal municipalities established in 2014
Municipalities in Koshi Province
Municipalities in Morang District